Amir Shervan, born Amir-Hossein Ghaffari (Persian: اميرحسين غفاری; May 24, 1929 – November 1, 2006), was an Iranian film director, producer, actor, and screenwriter.

Biography
After studying theatre in Pasadena, California, he returned to his home country, Iran, and had a prolific cinema career that began with Parviz Khatibi's 1949 film Vaareite Bahari (واریته بهاری). all the way to his own directorial debut Torkaman.

As a result of the Iranian Revolution, many Iranian films were censored or "purified" by the government, making it difficult for any films without a pro-Islamic angle to be made. This halted his filmmaking career, so he relocated to California  in 1980. Between 1980 and 1987, Shervan worked to build his production company, Hollywood Royal Productions, where he aimed to make American action films, taking influence from other massive hits of the 1980s, primarily Lethal Weapon.

From 1987 to 1992, produced and directed several action films, including, Hollywood Cop, Killing American Style, and Samurai Cop, which starred Matt Hannon and Robert Z'Dar. Many of the same locations are used throughout his films.  For example, the estate that the majority of Killing American Style is set on, is the same building that the climax of both Samurai Cop and Hollywood Cop is set at. Shervan was known to cut the budget in other places, such as filming all of his movies during the day to avoid buying lighting equipment to use for the night sequences, or using his own production van for car chase sequences.

After Samurai Cop in 1991, Shervan retired from filmmaking. Not much is known about his career outside of that. He died in 2006, only a year before his last film would find cult acclaim, and he would gain status as a B-movie director.

Samurai Cop was restored in a brand new HD transfer for theatrical and DVD release by distributor Cinema Epoch in 2013. Cinema Epoch will also release Shervan's other works, including  Killing American Style, Young Rebels, and Gypsy in restored versions.

Filmography 
 Torkaman (1974)
 Hollywood Cop (1987)
 Killing American Style (1988)
 Young Rebels (1989)
 Gypsy (1990)
 Samurai Cop (1991)

References

External links

 Amir Shervan Facebook Page

Iranian expatriates in the United States
Iranian emigrants to the United States
Iranian male film actors
Iranian film directors
Iranian film producers
Iranian screenwriters
Iranian male actors
People from Tehran
1929 births
2006 deaths